Golkanak (also Romanized as Golkānak; also known as Gol Kanag) is a village in Baryaji Rural District, in the Central District of Sardasht County, West Azerbaijan Province, Iran. At the 2006 census, its population was 472, in 86 families.

References 

Populated places in Sardasht County